Samuel Bindon may refer to:
 Samuel Bindon (Australian politician) (1812–1879)
 Samuel Bindon (Irish politician) ( 1715–1760)